In Italy, the Surveillance Magistracy (Magistratura di Sorveglianza) is a distinct branch of the Italian judiciary, with a specialized competence over the supervision of detainees and prisons.
It has the task of supervising the enforcement of sentences, of applying  alternative measures to imprisonment, of carrying out alternative sanctions and of applying and enforcing security measures.

Organization
The functions are exercised at two different levels: the Surveillance Judge acting alone, and the Surveillance Court, acting as a collegiate body.

The Surveillance Court (Tribunale di Sorveglianza) operates as a court of first instance, and as a court of appeal towards the decisions of the Surveillance Judge.
The Surveillance Court's jurisdiction encompasses a district of the Courts of Appeal.
A Surveillance Court is made up of a panel of four members: two Surveillance Judges and two persons with professional expertise in psychology, social services, education, psychiatry and clinical criminology, as lay judges.

A Surveillance Judge (Magistrato di Sorveglianza) is a judge of first instance. The decisions of these courts are given by a single judge (Magistrato di Sorveglianza) which deal with all matters related to the treatment of detainees.

The Surveillance Court of Rome is the court competent on nationwide level on appeals against the 41-bis prison regime decree.

 
Judiciary of Italy
Courts and tribunals with year of establishment missing